The 1978 Australian Championship of Makes was a CAMS sanctioned national motor racing title for car manufacturers. 
The championship was contested over a five-round series.
 Round 1, ABE Copiers 250, Oran Park, New South Wales, 30 July
 Round 2, Hang Ten 400, Sandown, Victoria, 10 September
 Round 3, Rothmans 250, Adelaide International Raceway, South Australia, 22 October
 Round 4, Rothmans 300, Surfers Paradise, Queensland, 5 November
 Round 5, McEwan Spanners Twin 250, Calder, Victoria, 2 & 3 December
All rounds were contested by Group C Touring Cars which competed in three classes according to engine capacity.
 Up to 2000cc
 2001 to 3000cc
 3001 to 6000cc
Championship points were awarded at each round on a 9-6-4-3-2-1 basis for the first six places in each class.
Only the best placed car from each manufacturer in each class was eligible to score points and points could not be aggregated across classes.

Results

References

External links
 Australian Titles Retrieved from CAMS Online Manual of Motor Sport on 12 September 2008

Australian Manufacturers' Championship
Makes
Australian Championship of Makes